This article lists governors of Trinidad.

Spanish governors (1506–1797)
Diego Colón – 1506 – 1526
Rodrigo de Bastidas – 1520
Don Antonio Sedeño – July 12, 1530 – 1538
Don Juan Ponce de León II 1571 – 1591
 Antonio de Berrío 1580 – 1597
Fernando de Berrío 1597 – 1612
Don Diego Palomeque de Acuña 1615 – 1618
Fernando de Berrío 1619 – 1622
Don Luis de Monsalves 1624 – 1631
Cristóval de Aranda 1631 – 1636
Diego López de Escobar 1636 – 1641
Don Martín de Mendoza y Berrío 1642 – 1657
Juan de Viedma 1657 – 1664
José de Aspe y Zuñiga 1665 – 1668
Diego Ximenes de Aldana 1670 – 1677
Tiburcio de Aspe y Zúñiga 1678 – 1682
Diego Suárez Ponce de León 1682 – 1688
Sebastian de Roseta 1688 – 1690
Francisco de Ménez 1692 – 1698
José de León Echales 1699
Francisco Ruíz de Aguirre 1700 – 1705
Felipe de Artineda 1705 – 1711
Cristóbal Félix de Guzmán 1711 – 1716
Pedro de Yarza 1716 – 1721
Juan de Orvay (acting) 1721
Martín Pérez de Anda y Salazar 1721 – 1726
Agustín de Arredonda 1726 – 1731
Bartholomé de Aldunate y Rada 1731 – 1732
Estevan Simón de Linán y Vera 1734 – 1746
Juan José Salcedo 1746 – 1752
Francisco Nanclares 1752 – 1757
Pedro de La Moneda 1757 – 1760
Jacinto San Juan 1760 – 1762
José Antonio Gil 1762 – 1766
José de Flores 1766 – 1773
Juan de Dios Valdés y Yarza 1773 – 1776
Don Manuel Falques 1776 – 1779 – Military Governor
 Martín de Salaverría 1779 – 1783 – Civil Governor
 Juan Francisco Machado 1781 – 1784
 José María Chacón  1784 – 1797

British governors  (1797–1889)
Sir Ralph Abercromby – 18 February 1797 – February 1797
Thomas Picton  Feb 1797 – Feb 1803  (military governor to 1801)
Commission (William Fullarton, Samuel Hood, Thomas Picton) – February 1803 – July 1804
Sir Thomas Hislop – July 1804 – 27 September 1811
Hector William Munro – 27 September 1811 – 14 June 1813
Sir Ralph Woodford – 14 June 1813 – January 1828
Henry Capadose (acting) – January 1828 – April 1828
Charles Felix Smith – April 1828 – 10 March 1829
Lewis Grant – 10 March 1829 – 22 April 1833
Sir George Hill – 22 April 1833 –  9 March 1839
John Alexander Mein (acting) – 9 March 1839 – April 1840
Henry George Macleod – April 1840 – 1846
George Francis Robert Harris, 3rd Baron Harris – 1846 – 1854
Legendre Charles Bourchier (acting) – 1854
Sir Charles Elliot – 10 March 1854 – 1856
B. Brooks (acting) – 1856 – 1857
Robert William Keate – 26 January 1857 – 1864
 ? Thompson (acting) -1864
Sir John Henry Thomas Manners-Sutton – 6 September 1864 – 1866
 Edward Everard Rushworth (acting) – 1866
Sir Arthur Charles Hamilton-Gordon – 7 November 1866 – 1870
James Robert Longden – 25 June 1870 – 1874
William Wellington Cairns – 2 May 1874 – 1874
John Scott Bushe (1st time) (acting) – 1874
Henry Turner Irving (1st time) – 20 November 1874 – 1876
John Scott Bushe (2nd time) (acting) – 1876 – 1877
William Des Vœux (acting) – 1877 – 1878
Henry Turner Irving (2nd time) – 1878 – 1880
William Rowland Pyne (acting) – 1880
William Alexander George Young (acting) – 1880
Sir Sanford Freeling – 2 November 1880 – 1884
John Scott Bushe (3rd time) (acting) – 1884
Sir Frederick Palgrave Barlee (acting) – 19 June 1884 – 8 August 1884
John Scott Bushe (4th time) (acting) – 1884 – 1885
Sir Arthur Elibank Havelock – 24 January 1885 – 1885
David Wilson (acting) 1885
 Sir William Robinson – 9 October 1885 – 1889 (continued as Governor of Trinidad and Tobago until 1891)

See also

List of governors of Tobago
List of governors of Trinidad and Tobago
List of governors-general of Trinidad and Tobago
List of presidents of Trinidad and Tobago
List of prime ministers of Trinidad and Tobago

References

External links
 Worldstatesman.com

Governors
Trinidad